This partial list of city nicknames in North Carolina compiles the aliases, sobriquets and slogans that cities in North Carolina are known by (or have been known by historically), officially and unofficially, to municipal governments, local people, outsiders or their tourism boards or chambers of commerce. City nicknames can help in establishing a civic identity, helping outsiders recognize a community or attracting people to a community because of its nickname; promote civic pride; and build community unity. Nicknames and slogans that successfully create a new community "ideology or myth" are also believed to have economic value. Their economic value is difficult to measure, but there are anecdotal reports of cities that have achieved substantial economic benefits by "branding" themselves by adopting new slogans.

Some unofficial nicknames are positive, while others are derisive, divisive or just downright negative. The unofficial nicknames listed here have been in use for a long time or have gained wide currency.
Apex – Peak of Good Living
Asheboro- A-Town
A-Boro
Zoo City
Asheville – San Francisco of the South
Boone – Firefly Capital of the World
Brevard – Home of the white squirrels
Burlington – B-Town The Buck Bucktown, Burvegas, Bigger Better Burlington Motto(s): Esse quam vider
Calabash – Seafood Capital of the World
Cape Hatteras – The Graveyard of the Atlantic, Irvine World News, February 22, 2004
Carolina Beach – C.B.
Carrboro – Paris of the Piedmont
Chadbourn – Strawberry Capital of the World
Chapel Hill – The Southern Part of Heaven
Charlotte
Queen City
Mint City
The Hornet's Nest
City of Trees
Durham – City of The Viper, The Bull City
Erwin – Denim Capital of the World
Fayetteville
All-American City
City of Dogwoods
Fayettenam
The Ville
2-6
Fay-Raq
Tar Heel Town
Torture Town
The Soldier City
Gastonia
Spindle City
Gashouse
G-Ville
Little Chicago

Greensboro 
The Gate City
The Boro
G-Boro
Greenville
The Emerald City
G-Vegas
High Point – Furniture capital of the world
Jacksonville - Marine Town ** Gateway to Lost Souls ** The O9
Kannapolis – City of Looms
Leland – L.A. ( Leland Area )
Lexington
L-Town
"The BBQ Capital of the World"
Lincolnton
L-Town
Lancton
Mooresville, North Carolina – The Dirty Mo
Mount Airy, North Carolina
Mayberry
The Granite City
Maggie Valley – Clogging Capital of the World
New Bern
The Bern
The Birthplace of Pepsi
First Capital of North Carolina
Pinehurst – Golf Capital of the World
Raleigh
The City of Oaks
Raleigh Wood
Ruff Raleigh
Oak City
The Big Acorn
Rocky Mount
City On The Rise
Murder Mount
Thomasville
Chair City
T-Ville
Wilmington
Hollywood East
Wilmy
Wilmo
The Dub
The Port City
Wilmywood
Winston-Salem 
Camel City
Tre-Fo
The Twin City
Tobaccotown

See also
 List of city nicknames in the United States

References

North Carolina cities and towns
Populated places in North Carolina
City nicknames